The FA Women's National League Plate is an association football tournament organised by the FA Women's National League (WNL). It is the WNL's second league cup competition, played alongside the National League Cup, and is a single-elimination knock-out tournament.

History
The WPL Plate was introduced in 2014 following a restructuring of women's football in England. Historically the WPL had consisted of three divisions: a National Division at the top, with two regional divisions, North and South, below. The WPL was the top level of women's football in England until the introduction of the Women's Super League in 2011, then in 2014 WSL 2 was also inserted above the WPL in the league structure. This led to the National Division being abolished and the former Combination Leagues, which had been below the WPL in the pyramid,  were incorporated as four regional divisions one level below the North and South. This meant the number of divisions in the Women's National League had doubled from three to six, so a second cup competition was added to complement the existing National League Cup.

Structure
The teams competing in each season's Women's National League Plate is decided by the first round of the WPL Cup, which is known as the Determining Round. All 72 WPL teams are drawn in this round, with the winners of each match continuing in the Cup and the losers being entered into the Plate.

As there are 36 losing teams in the determining round, a preliminary round of the Plate is held between a small number of teams to bring the number of participants down to 32, allowing a normal knock-out tournament to be held. The winners of each game proceed to the next stage, while the losers are eliminated from the tournament. All games are played over a single leg, with draws being settled by extra time and penalty kicks where required, and the final is held at a neutral venue.

List of finals

(N)=Team played in Northern Division, (S)=Played in Southern Division, (M1)=Played in Midlands Division One, (N1)=Played in Northern Division One, (SE1)=Played in South East Division One

References

 
Recurring sporting events established in 2014